Grupo Corpo are a Brazilian dance theatre company founded in 1975. The group performs internationally and has been acclaimed by critics. Their routines are particularly known for challenging audience perceptions of ballet and modern dance.

History
Grupo Corpo was created in Belo Horizonte by Paulo Pederneiras. It is a contemporary dance company, which is typically Brazilian in its creations. During Corpo's history, it went through several changes in style and structure but has always maintained the common thread of using a Brazilian base to its dancing and music.

The group's first ballet was Maria Maria. it reached a record as far as local production goes: the company traveled through 14 countries and ran in Brazil from 1976 to 1982.

References

External links
 The Official Grupo Corpo Site 
Archive film of Grupo Corpo dancing Nazareth in 2004 at Jacob's Pillow

Theatre companies in Brazil